Andrea Zlatar Violić (born 13 April 1961) is Croatian editor of literature magazines Vijenac, Zarez and Gordogan.

She studied humanities at the University of Zagreb where she received her Doctorate in 1992.

From December 23, 2011, until March 25, 2015 she was the Minister of Culture in the centre left Government of Zoran Milanović. She was the second female Minister of Culture in Croatia (after Ljerka Mintas-Hodak). Zlatar-Violić resigned in March 2015 after an internal audit found financial irregularities with herself and other officials not repaying cash taken out for business trips in a timely manner.

In June 2013, while she minister of culture, Zlatar-Violić was fined 15,000 Croatian kuna for an undeclared conflict of interest due to the Ministry of Culture financing the magazine Zarez which was published by the firm Druga strana of which she was a part owner. On 2 February 2016, the Administrative Court of Croatia confirmed a verdict that Zlatar-Violić was guilty of conflict of interest when she awarded the web portal Autograf a grant of 70,000 Croatian kuna in 2014 and ordered her to pay 6,000 Croatian kuna to the state.

She is a member of the Croatian People's Party – Liberal Democrats.

References

1961 births
Living people
Politicians from Zagreb
University of Zagreb alumni
Academic staff of the University of Zagreb
Croatian People's Party – Liberal Democrats politicians
Culture ministers of Croatia
Women government ministers of Croatia
Croatian editors